Gourav Menon, also known as Master Gaurav Menon is an Indian actor from the Malayalam film industry. Making his acting debut with Philips and the Monkey Pen in 2013, Gourav later won the National Film Award for Best Child Artist and the Kerala State Film Award for Best Child Artist in 2015 for the film Ben.

Filmography

Awards

|-
! scope="row" | 2015
| Ben
| National Film Award for Best Child Artist
| 
|-
! scope="row" | 2015
| Ben
| Kerala State Film Award for Best Child Artist
| 
|-

References

External links

2004 births
Living people
Male actors in Malayalam cinema
Indian male film actors
21st-century Indian male actors
21st-century Indian male child actors
Best Child Artist National Film Award winners